Egyptian Revival is an architectural style that uses the motifs and imagery of ancient Egypt. It is attributed generally to the public awareness of ancient Egyptian monuments generated by Napoleon's conquest of Egypt and Admiral Nelson's defeat of the French Navy at the Battle of the Nile in 1798. Napoleon took a scientific expedition with him to Egypt. Publication of the expedition's work, the Description de l'Égypte, began in 1809 and was published as a series through 1826. The size and monumentality of the façades discovered during his adventure cemented the hold of Egyptian aesthetics on the Parisian elite.  However, works of art and architecture (such as funerary monuments) in the Egyptian style had been made or built occasionally on the European continent and the British Isles since the time of the Renaissance.

History

Egyptian influence before Napoleon
Much of the early knowledge about ancient Egyptian arts and architecture was filtered through the lens of the Classical world, including ancient Rome. Prior to Napoleon's influence an early example is the Obelisk of Domitian, erected in 1651 by Bernini on top of the Fontana dei Quattro Fiumi in Piazza Navona, Rome, which went on to inspire several Egyptian obelisks constructed in Ireland during the early 18th century. It influenced the obelisk constructed as a family funeral memorial by Sir Edward Lovatt Pierce for the Allen family at Stillorgan in Ireland in 1717, one of several Egyptian obelisks erected in Ireland during the early 18th century. Others may be found at Belan, County Kildare; and Dangan, County Meath. The Casteltown Folly in County Kildare is probably the best known, albeit the least Egyptian-styled.

Egyptian buildings had also been built as garden follies. The most elaborate was probably the one built by Frederick I, Duke of Württemberg in the gardens of the Château de Montbéliard. It included an Egyptian bridge across which guests walked to reach an island with an elaborate Egyptian-influenced bath house. Designed by the duke's court architect, Jean Baptiste Kleber, the building had a billiards room and a bagnio.

During the 2nd half of the 18th century, with the rise of Neoclassicism, sometimes architects mixed the Ancient Greek, Roman and Egyptian styles. They wanted to discover new shape and ornament ideas, rather than to be just faithful copyists of the past.

Napoleonic and Post-Napoleonic eras
New after the Napoleonic invasion was a sudden increase of the number of works of art and the fact that, for the first time, entire buildings began to be built to resemble those of ancient Egypt. In France and Britain this was at least partially inspired by successful war campaigns undertaken by each country while in Egypt.

For Napoleon's intention of cataloguing the sights and findings from the campaign, hundreds of artists and scientists were enlisted to document “antiquities, ethnography, architecture, and natural history of Egypt”; and later these notes and sketches were taken back to Europe. In 1803, the compilation of “Description de l’Egypte” was started based on these documents and lasted over twenty years. The content in this archaeological text, includes translation of the Rosetta Stone, pyramids and other scenes, arouse interests in Egyptian arts and culture in Europe and America.

According to Curl, people started to present their imaginations about Egypt in various ways. First, combinations of crocodiles, pyramids, mummies, sphinxes, and other motifs were widely circulated. In 1800, an Egyptian opera festival was staged in Drury Lane, London, with Egyptian-themed sets and costumes. On the other hand, William Capon (1757–1827) suggested a massive pyramid for Shooter's Hill as a National Monument, while George Smith (1783–1869) designed an Egyptian-style tomb for Ralph Abercromby in Alexandria.

According to David Brownlee, the 1798 Karlsruhe Synagogue, an early building by the influential Friedrich Weinbrenner was "the first large Egyptian building to be erected since antiquity."  According to Diana Muir Appelbaum, it was "the first public building (that is, not a folly, stage set, or funeral monument) in the Egyptian revival style."  The ancient Egyptian influence was mainly shown in the two large engaged pylons flanking the entrance; otherwise the windows and entrance of the central section were pointed arches, and the overall plan conventional, with Neo-Gothic details.

Among the earliest monuments of the Egyptian Revival in Paris is the Fontaine du Fellah, built in 1806. It was designed by François-Jean Bralle. A well-documented example, destroyed after Napoleon was deposed, was the monument to General Louis Desaix in the Place des Victoires was built in 1810. It featured a nude statue of the general and an obelisk, both set upon an Egyptian Revival base. Another example of a still standing site of Egyptian Revival is the Egyptian Gate of Tsarskoe Selo, built in 1829.

A street or passage named the Place du Caire or Foire du Caire (Fair of Cairo) was built in Paris in 1798 on the former site of the convent of the "Filles de la Charité". No. 2 Place du Caire, from 1828, is essentially in overall form a conventional Parisian structure with shops on the ground floor and apartments above, but with considerable Egyptianizing decoration including a row of massive Hathor heads and a frieze by sculptor J. G. Garraud.

One of the first British buildings to show an Egyptian Revival interior was the newspaper office of the Courier on the Strand in London.  It was built in 1804 and featured a cavetto (coved) cornice and Egyptian-influenced columns with palmiform capitals.  Other early British examples include the Egyptian Hall in London, completed in 1812, and the Egyptian Gallery, a private room in the home of connoisseur Thomas Hope to display his Egyptian antiquities, and illustrated in engravings from his meticulous line drawings in his book Household Furniture (1807), were a prime source for the Regency style of British furnishings.

Rise of Egyptian Revival in America 

Around the 1870s, Americans started to become interested in other cultures, including those of Japan, the Middle East and North Africa. These were reflected in various decorative arts, especially architecture and furniture. Egyptian motifs and symbols were commonly used in the design including elements of "gilt bronze fittings shaped like sphinxes, Egyptian scenes woven into textiles, and geometric renderings of plants such as palm fronds".

The reason behind the rise of Egyptian Revival architecture in the United States is the long and great history of the ancient Egyptian civilization. Architectures with an Egyptian character have a powerfully compelling feel. They gain stability and power in their primitive and massive forms, expressing emotions and embodying a strong sense of monumentality. This style of architectural revival signifies that the United States has drawn on the inner spirit of the ancient Egyptian civilization and has inherited all the great qualities of that civilization. A young nation such as the United States needed to actively seek the support of the ancient Egyptian civilization to refute the accusations of European critics that the United States was a nation without a history. It was for this reason that the American rural cemetery movement, the construction of monumental obelisks, flourished.  

The influence of Egyptian Revival on the cemetery design and culture in United States has been well represented by the Green-wood cemetery park in New York. Because of the mixing of various cultures in Brooklyn by immigration, the Green-wood cemetery park has provided a high tolerance environment for the Egyptian Revival. Besides a certain amount of the typical Egyptian element obelisks, the variety of the monumental constructions in Egyptian Revival style have reflected the thoughts of people and the local culture as well as the acceptance of imported style. Under the background of the population of Christian Victorian funerary art, the design and implementation of Egyptian Revival monuments have shown the eternity and uniqueness in a certain degree. 

Some Americans in the 1880s believed that the United States was a nation without art and therefore wanted to innovate in the field of aesthetic design to distinguish it from Egyptian pyramids and obelisks, Greek temples, and Gothic spires. But implementing such innovations was difficult, and as Clarence King said, “Till there is an American race there cannot be an American style”. The creation of the American style was also hindered by the fact that the ethnic mix of the American people did not constitute a race. In the time that followed, however, America's own culture was assimilating Egyptian revivalist architecture, and their tectonic significance became unstable. This may be because the United States of the early 20th century was a confident nation, and the approach of defining one's own spiritual world by establishing a connection to a great civilization like ancient Egypt faded in such a cultural context.

Later revivals

Egyptian Revival architecture enjoyed considerable popularity in other countries as well. The first Egyptian Revival building in the United States was the 1824 synagogue building of Congregation Mikveh Israel Synagogue in Philadelphia, Pennsylvania  It was followed by a series of major public buildings in the first half of the 19th century including the 1835 Philadelphia County Prison, Philadelphia, Pennsylvania, United States, the 1836 Fourth District Police Station in New Orleans and the 1838 New York City jail known as the Tombs.  Other public buildings in Egyptian style included the 1844 Old Whaler's Church in Sag Harbor, New York, the 1846 First Baptist Church in Essex, Connecticut, the 1845 Egyptian Building of the Medical College of Virginia in Richmond and the 1848 United States Custom House in New Orleans.  The most notable Egyptian structure in the United States was the Washington Monument, begun in 1848, this obelisk originally featured doors with cavetto cornices and winged sun disks, later removed. The National World War I Museum and Memorial in Kansas City, Missouri is another example of Egyptian revival architecture and art.

The South African College in the then-British Cape Colony features an "Egyptian building" constructed in 1841; the Egyptian Revival building of the Cape Town Hebrew Congregation is also still standing.

The York Street Synagogue was Australia's first Egyptian revival building, followed by the Hobart Synagogue, the Launceston Synagogue and the Adelaide Hebrew Congregation, all by 1850.  The earliest obelisk in Australia was erected at Macquarie Place, Sydney in 1818.

The expeditions that eventually led to the discovery in 1922 of the treasure of Tutankhamun's's tomb by archaeologist Howard Carter resulted in a 20th-century revival.  The revival during the 1920s is sometimes considered to be part of the Art Deco style. This phase gave birth to the Egyptian theatre movement, largely confined to the United States. The Egyptian Revival decorative arts style was present in furniture and other household objects, as well as in architecture.

Hieroglyphics 
Many notable works in Britain featured attempts by architects to translate and depict messages in Egyptian hieroglyphics. Although sincere attempts at compositions, understanding of hieroglyphic syntax and semantics has advanced since they were built and errors have been discovered in many of these works. Although both public and private buildings were built in Britain in the Egyptian Revival style, the vast majority of those with attempts at accurate inscriptions were public works or on entrances to public buildings.

In 1824, French classical scholar and egyptologist J.F. Champollion published Precis du systeme hieroglyphique des anciens Egyptiens in 1824, which spurred the first notable attempts to decipher the hieroglyphic language in Britain. Joseph Bonomi's inscriptions in the entrance lodges to Abney Park cemetery in 1840 was the first real recorded attempt to compose a legible text. An Egyptologist himself, Bonomi and other scholars such as Samuel Birch, Samuel Sharpe, William Osburne, and others would compose texts for a variety of other British projects throughout the nineteenth century - including Marshall's Mill in Leeds, an aedicula in the grounds of the Hartwell House, and as part of an Egyptian exhibition in the Crystal Palace after it was re-erected in southeast London.

The content of the inscriptions varied depending on the nature of their specific projects. The Crystal Palace exhibition features several different inscriptions, with the main inscription detailing the construction and content of the hall and proclaiming it as an educational asset to the community. It ends with a message to invoke good fortune, translated as 'let it be prosperous.' Other smaller inscriptions on the cornice of the exhibit entrance feature the names of the builders and a message in Greek wishing for the health and well-being of Queen Victoria and Prince Albert, members of the royal family. The main inscription is accompanied by an English translation, with the characters spaced to match the position of the English words. However, Chris Elliot notes that the translation overly relies on phonetic transliteration and features some unusual characters for words that were difficult to translate into hieroglyphs.

List of buildings

North America 

 The First Presbyterian Church in Nashville, Tennessee, designed by William Strickland from 1849 to 1851
 The Washington Monument in Washington, D.C.
 The Battle Monument in Baltimore, Maryland
 The New Jersey State Penitentiary in Trenton, New Jersey, designed by John Haviland from 1833 to 1836
 The Medical College at Richmond in Richmond, Virginia, designed by Thomas S. Stewart in 1845
 1826–1830: Groton Monument in Groton, Connecticut, United States
 1834-1835: American Institute, New York City (Front Elevation)
 1835: Philadelphia County Prison, Philadelphia, Pennsylvania, United States. Designed by Thomas Ustick Walter, it was demolished in 1968.
 1836: 4th Precinct Police Station on Rousseau Street in New Orleans. Designed by Benjamin Buisson, it originally served as a jail and police station. Later altered significantly; now used by the Knights of Babylon krewe for Mardi Gras float storage.
 1838: Green-Wood Cemetery in New York City
 1838: The Tombs, a court and jail complex in New York City by John Haviland. Demolished and replaced by a new building in 1902.
 1838: Pennsylvania Fire Insurance building, Philadelphia [1] by John Haviland. Extant.
 1840: Gates of the Granary Burying Ground, by Isaiah Rogers, in Boston, Massachusetts, United States.
 1842: Croton Distributing Reservoir in New York City.
 1827–1843: Bunker Hill Monument in Charlestown, Boston, Massachusetts, United States.
 1843: Gates and gatehouses of Mount Auburn Cemetery in Cambridge, Massachusetts, United States. Designed by Jacob Bigelow.
 1844: Old Whaler's Church, Sag Harbor, New York, United States. Designed by Minard Lafever.
 1845: The brownstone entry gates of the Grove Street Cemetery, by Henry Austin, New Haven, Connecticut, United States
 1846: First Baptist Church in Essex, Connecticut
 1856: Skull and Bones undergraduate secret society at Yale University, New Haven, Connecticut in the United States. Architect's attribution in dispute, but may also be Henry Austin of the Grove Street Cemetery gates.
 1914: Masonic Temple in Charlotte, North Carolina, United States (1914–87).
1914-1916: Winona Savings Bank Building, Winona, Minnesota
 1920: Marmon Hupmobile Showroom, Chicago, Illinois, United States. Designed by Paul Gerhardt.
 1922: Grauman's Egyptian Theatre, Los Angeles, California, United States.
 1927: Pythian Temple, New York City.
 1928: Lincoln Theatre, Columbus, Ohio, United States. Has an Egyptian revival interior.
 1939: Social Security Administration Building, Washington, D.C, United States.
 1966: Rosicrucian Egyptian Museum, San Jose, California, United States.

Europe, Russia, Africa and Australia 

 18–12 BC Pyramid of Cestius, Rome
 1798 Karlsruhe Synagogue
 circa 1820: Memorial to Elizabeth Donkin, Port Elizabeth, South Africa.
 1822: Egyptian temple in Łazienki Park, Warsaw, Poland
 1824: 42 Fore Street in Hertford, known locally as the Egyptian House, is an English Heritage Grade II listed building built on the site of a former inn. A grocery store from the Victorian era until the 1960s, now a restaurant.
 1825–1826: Egyptian Bridge in St. Petersburg. Collapsed on 20 January 1905, although the new bridge (1955) incorporated sphinxes and several portions of it remains.
 1827–1830: Egyptian Gates in Tsarskoe Selo, St. Petersburg
 1835–1837: The Egyptian House in Penzance, Cornwall. Built by local bookseller John Lavin as a museum, it is still standing.
 1836-1840: Temple Works, a former flax mill in the industrial district of Holbeck in Leeds, UK. Built for textile industrialist John Marshall and held the distinction of being the largest single room in the world when it was built.
 1838–1839: The Egyptian Avenue and inner circle of the Lebanon Circle in Highgate Cemetery, London.
 1838–1840: Abney Park Temple Lodges, Hackney, London.
 1844: Launceston Synagogue, Launceston, Tasmania, Australia.
 1845: Hobart Synagogue, Hobart, Tasmania, Australia.
 1846–1848: Old Synagogue at Canterbury, England, United Kingdom.
 1849: Lighthouse of l'Agulhas, the second-oldest lighthouse in South Africa, also called the "Pharos of the South".
 1856: Egyptian Temple housing elephants at the Antwerp Zoo. Designed by Charles Servais.
 1862–1864: Egyptian temple in the park of Stibbert Museum, Florence, Italy.
 1867: Queen's Park Church in Queen's Park, Glasgow.
 1870: The Egyptian Halls in Glasgow. Designed by Alexander Thomson.
 1881–1889: Mausoleo Schilizzi in Naples, Italy.
 1891: The Typhonium built in 1891 near Wissant by the Belgian architect Edmond De Vigne
 1899: Sha'ar Hashamayim Synagogue (Cairo), Cairo, Egypt
 1914: Regional Studies Museum in Krasnoyarsk, Russia
 1919: Mukhtar Museum, Cairo, Egypt
 1921: Louxor theater, Paris, France.
 1922: Collège des Frères d'Heliopolis, Cairo, Egypt
 1925: AbdulHamid al-Shawarby Pasha building, Cairo, Egypt
 1927: Emulation Hall, Melbourne, Australia
 1927: Mausoleum of Saad Zaghloul, Cairo, Egypt
1927– 1928: Collins & Parri's Arcadia Works for Carreras, London
 1924–1929: Lenin's Mausoleum, Moscow, Russia. Designed by Aleksey Shchusev, it utilizes elements borrowed from the Pyramid of Djoser.
 1926–1928: Carreras Cigarette Factory, Camden, London.
 1930: The foyer of Oliver P. Bernard's Strand Palace Hotel, London (destr. 1967–8; parts now London, V&A)
 1932: Ismailia Monuments Museum, Ismailia, Egypt
 1933: Moussa Dar'I Synagogue, Cairo, Egypt
 1934 Pyramid Theatre, Sale, Greater Manchester, UK (formerly a cinema, both independent and Odeon now a Sports Direct)
 1930–1937: National Museum of Beirut, Beirut.
 1934: Former Perth Girls' School, Perth, Western Australia, Australia.
 1937: Manly Town Hall, Manly, New South Wales, Australia.
 1942: Faculty of Engineering, Alexandria University campus, Alexandria, Egypt
 1961: Cairo Tower, Cairo, Egypt
 1974: Unknown Soldier Memorial (Egypt), Cairo, Egypt
 Unknown: Lamati Court, Minya, Egypt

Post-Modern variants 

 1989: Louvre Pyramid, Paris.
 1991: Pyramid Arena, Memphis, Tennessee, United States.
 1992: Cheesecake Factory, United States.
 1993: Tama-Re, Eatonton, Georgia, United States. Demolished 2005.
 1993: Luxor Hotel and Casino, Las Vegas, Nevada, United States.
 1995: City Stars Heliopolis, Cairo, Egypt
 1996: The Lost World of Reptiles, an exhibit at the Australian Reptile Park, Somersby, New South Wales, Australia
 1997: Wafi City, Wafi, Dubai City, Dubai UAE
 1997: Sunway Pyramid, Bandar Sunway, Malaysia.
 2001: Supreme Constitutional Court of Egypt building, Cairo.
 2001: Scotiabank Theatre Chinook Centre, Calgary, Alberta
 2010: Sohag International Airport terminal building, Sohag, Egypt
 2010: Fairmont Nile City, Cairo, Egypt
 2019-present: New Administrative Capital, Egypt, including Iconic Tower (Egypt), Oblisco Capitale, The Octagon (Egypt), Egyptian New Parliament, Presidential Palace and more
 2020: 4J97+72G El Shorouk, Egypt
 2022: Cairo Security Directorate, New Cairo, Egypt

See also

 Egyptian Revival decorative arts
 Ancient Egyptian architecture
 Egyptian Revival architecture in the British Isles
 List of pyramid mausoleums in North America

Notes

References

External links 
 

 
Architectural styles
Revival architectural styles